Hal McIntyre (born Harold William McIntyre; November 29, 1914, Cromwell, Connecticut – May 5, 1959 Los Angeles, California) was an American saxophonist, clarinetist, and bandleader.

McIntyre played extensively as a teenager and led his own octet in 1935. Shortly thereafter, he was offered a temporary slot as an alto saxophonist behind Benny Goodman; this lasted only ten days, but Glenn Miller heard of his ability and drafted him as a founding member of the Glenn Miller Orchestra, where he played from 1937 to 1941.

Miller encouraged McIntyre to start his own group again, and the McIntyre Orchestra first played in New Rochelle, New York in 1941; the ensemble included vocalists Gloria Van, Ruth Gaylor, and Al Nobel, bassist Eddie Safranski, and saxophonist Allen Eager. They played many major ballrooms throughout the United States, and played overseas for troops during World War II. He toured extensively with songstress Sunny Gale until the summer of '51. He maintained the orchestra into the 1950s, backing The Mills Brothers for their 1952 smash hit "Glow Worm".

He co-wrote the song "Daisy Mae" with Billy May which was recorded by Glenn Miller and His Orchestra.

McIntyre was critically injured in an apartment fire in 1959, and died at a hospital a few days later.

Radio
Beginning January 2, 1945, McIntyre and his orchestra had a weekly broadcast on the Blue Network. One feature of the program was that on each program the orchestra would "play the theme song of one of America's college fraternities as a salute to some member of that fraternity who has distinguished himself in the war effort."

References

General references

 Jason Ankeny, [ Hal McIntyre], All Music Guide
 George T. Simon (1912–2001), The Big Bands, revised edition, Macmillan Publishing Co., Collier Books (1974)
 Charles Eugene Claghorn (12-12-1911 – Oct 30, 2005), Biographical Dictionary of American Music, p. 290, Parker Publishing Co., West Nyack, New York (1973), 
 Charles Eugene Claghorn (12-12-1911 – Oct 30, 2005), Biographical Dictionary of Jazz, Prentice Hall, Englewood Cliffs, New Jersey (1982)
 Biography Index, a cumulative index to biographical material in books and magazines. Volume 16: September 1988 to August 1990, H.W. Wilson Co., New York (1990)
 Roger D. Kinkle (1916–2000), The Complete Encyclopedia of Popular Music and Jazz, 1900-1950, Three volumes, Arlington House Publishers, New Rochelle, New York (1974)
 Colin Larkin (born 1949), The Encyclopedia of Popular Music, Third edition. Eight volumes. MUZE, London (1998); Grove's Dictionaries, New York (1998)
 Barry Dean Kernfeld (born 1950), The New Grove Dictionary of Jazz, First edition, Two volumes, Macmillan Press, London (1988)
 Barry Dean Kernfeld (born 1950), The New Grove Dictionary of Jazz, St. Martin's Press, New York (1994)
 Barry Dean Kernfeld (born 1950), The New Grove Dictionary of Jazz, Second edition, Three volumes, Macmillan Publishers, London (2002)
 Donald Clarke (born 1940), The Penguin Encyclopedia of Popular Music, Viking Press, New York (1989)

Inline citations

1914 births
1959 deaths
American jazz bandleaders
American jazz saxophonists
American male saxophonists
American jazz clarinetists
Big band bandleaders
20th-century American saxophonists
People from Cromwell, Connecticut
Jazz musicians from Connecticut
20th-century American male musicians
American male jazz musicians
Glenn Miller Orchestra members